The Cushing Homestead is a historic house at 210 East Street in Hingham, Massachusetts. The home is a -story rear saltbox, and has traces of both 17th-century English style as well as later 18th-century Georgian. The two rooms that originally made up the house look much today as they likely did before the house was later enlarged.

The house was built in 1678 by town clerk and magistrate Daniel Cushing of Bachelor's Row for his son Peter Cushing, born in 1646. Peter Cushing later operated a mill on land across from the home. The home is one of Hingham's oldest and was added to the National Historic Register in 1973. It has also been designated a Massachusetts Historic Landmark. The house sits on a ten-acre lot.

The white clapboard structure centers on a five-bay facade that faces south. Inside, the house has sponge painting believed to have been done applied before 1700, as well as an enormous original working fireplace. The property of the Cushing Homestead includes a barn, corncrib and a forge. Also on the property are the ancient mill site and dam, a former Native American fishing hole, old stone walls and markers, and a large hayfield – all speaking to Hingham's early agricultural beginnings.

"It is probably one of the most important homesteads in Hingham, beautifully maintained inside and out,’’ says Hingham-based architectural historian Monique Lehner.

The property's barn, said to be the oldest in the United States, is constructed of timber that originally was part of Hingham's first meeting house, replaced by the Old Ship Church in 1681. The barn is a shingle-covered structure in a pitched roof style, and has ornamental red trim. The house has been occupied for over three centuries by descendants in the male line of the original builder, the son of Puritan Matthew Cushing, who arrived in Hingham from Norfolk, England, in 1638.

Among the Cushing family members who have occupied the home since it was built was Capt. Peter Cushing (1741–1783), grandson and namesake of the first owner. A selectman and constable of Hingham, Capt. Cushing commanded a company of troops during the Revolutionary War under fellow townsman General Benjamin Lincoln.

An elm tree on the property, a local landmark for years, was famous as the place where pastor John Brown preached to a group of Minutemen from Cohasset in 1775. The soldiers afterwards took part in the Siege of Boston under Col. (later Brigadier General) John Greaton.

See also
List of the oldest buildings in Massachusetts
National Register of Historic Places listings in Plymouth County, Massachusetts

References

Houses completed in 1678
Houses in Hingham, Massachusetts
National Register of Historic Places in Plymouth County, Massachusetts
1678 establishments in Massachusetts
Houses on the National Register of Historic Places in Plymouth County, Massachusetts